Litoreibacter ascidiaceicola is a Gram-negative, aerobic and non-motile bacterium from the genus of Litoreibacter which has been isolated from the sea squirt Halocynthia aurantium from Namhae in Korea.

References 

Rhodobacteraceae
Bacteria described in 2014